The Dominion Labor Party (Alberta) was a minor political party. It was founded on June 11, 1918 when Edmonton's Labour Representation League renamed itself the Alberta wing of the DLP. Its executive included Mr. Marshall, Mr. Mercer, Mr. Dan Knott, later mayor of the city, White (later Labour MLA), Findlay and Farmilo (both later to be aldermen), and Elmer Roper, later mayor Edmonton.

A branch of the DLP was founded in Calgary in March 1919 as the Federated Labor Party and was renamed the Dominion Labor Party that same year.

The Edmonton area locals renamed themselves locals of the Canadian Labour Party in the early 1920s, but southern Alberta locals such as the one at Lethbridge continued under the Dominion name. Both district organizations were the largest sections of each of their parties, so the terms CLP and Alberta CLP, DLP and Alberta DLP, were almost equivalent. Alberta, having strong radical working-class communities centred around coal mining and other heavy industries, elected a number of Labour MLAs in 1921 and 1926 and two Labour MPs in 1921. This ended with the massive election of the bank-reformist Social Credit government of William Aberhart in 1935.

It was disbanded in favour of the Co-operative Commonwealth Federation in 1942.

Early history
The party was founded at a convention held in the Labor temple in Calgary on March 29, 1919. Holmes Jowett was named provisional president. The party was founded to contest elections in federal Alberta ridings and on the provincial level. The party consolidated the former Alberta Labor Representation League and was joined by Centre Calgary Member of the Legislative Assembly Alex Ross. The first executive of the party included former MLA Donald McNabb as First Vice President.

1921 Alberta general election
The Labour Party contested the 1921 Alberta general election. The party ran 10 candidates. In addition to its natural opponents, the Liberals and Conservatives, it competed with the Independent Labor Party, which fielded candidates in the election.

Holmes Jowett was party leader. He did not contest a seat in the Legislature, instead spent his time helping his party's candidates.

The party worked in close co-operation with the United Farmers of Alberta – the two parties largely avoiding running candidates against each other.

Four Dominion Labor Party members were elected to the Legislative Assembly – Fred White  and Alex Ross in Calgary, William Johnston in Medicine Hat. Philip Christophers (a Communist) in the Rocky Mountain constituency. Alex Ross was invited to join the United Farmers cabinet and served as Minister of Public Works.

In the federal election that same year, two Labour candidates were elected in Calgary, William Irvine and Joseph Shaw. (All the other Alberta ridings elected UFA MPs.)

In 1922, The Dominion Labour Party was by then only active in Alberta – Labour activities in Manitoba being done under the name Independent Labour Party; in BC under the name Socialist Party of Canada. A new labour body, the Canadian Labour Party, was founded and the Edmonton area branch of the Dominion Labour Party began operating under the new name. The DLP organization in Calgary, Lethbridge and Medicine Hat carried on under the old Dominion Labor name.

In the 1926 provincial election, five Labour MLAs were elected, including Lionel Gibbs in Edmonton and Fred White (Calgary) and Philip Christophers (Rocky Mountain constituency) who were re-elected. Four of them were re-elected in 1930, and in the next few years the Dominion Labour Party and the Canadian Labour Party joined with the UFA and other groups to form the Co-operative Commonwealth Federation. Soon the DLP was disbanded and later (in 1942) the Edmonton CLP was disbanded.

References

Provincial political parties in Alberta
Political parties established in 1919
1919 establishments in Alberta
Political parties disestablished in 1942
1942 disestablishments in Canada